Jub Baghan-e Olya (also Romanized as Jūb Bāghān-e ‘Olyā) is a village in Direh Rural District, in the Central District of Gilan-e Gharb County, Kermanshah Province, Iran. At the 2006 census, its population was 120, in 26 families.

References 

Populated places in Gilan-e Gharb County